"Salió el Sol" ("The Sun Came Out") is the third single by Don Omar taken from his album King of Kings. The song appears in Grand Theft Auto IV.

Music video 
The music video was released on December 24, 2006. Upon release, the video has managed to surpass over 150 million views on YouTube. The video is also featured on the DV of the deluxe r-release am King of Kings: Armageddon Edition.

Chart positions

References

2006 songs
2006 singles
Spanish-language songs
Don Omar songs
Songs written by Don Omar
Universal Music Group singles